Terence Arthur Burns (born 15 April 1938) is a former New Zealand cricketer. Born in Wellington, Burns was a right-handed bat and right-arm medium-pace bowler who took five wickets in his two first-class matches for Northern Districts during the 1964–65 season.

Career

Burns played his two first-class matches in February 1965, both in Seddon Park in Hamilton, New Zealand, against the touring Pakistan side and Canterbury. Against the Pakistanis, on 4 February, Burns made seven runs in Northern Districts' only innings, and took three wickets in his first innings with the ball, those of Ghulam Abbas, Masood-ul-Hasan and Farooq Hamid. In his second match he took two Canterbury wickets in their first innings, and made two runs in Northern Districts' first innings. The match was drawn as Northern Districts, following on, ended the final day five down with Burns not required to bat.

References

External links

1938 births
Northern Districts cricketers
New Zealand cricketers
Cricketers from Wellington City
Living people